Francis Belavantheran (born 5 June 1948) is a Malaysian field hockey player. He competed at the 1968 Summer Olympics, the 1972 Summer Olympics and the 1976 Summer Olympics.

References

External links
 

1948 births
Living people
Malaysian male field hockey players
Olympic field hockey players of Malaysia
Field hockey players at the 1968 Summer Olympics
Field hockey players at the 1972 Summer Olympics
Field hockey players at the 1976 Summer Olympics
Malaysian people of Tamil descent
Malaysian sportspeople of Indian descent
Place of birth missing (living people)